Music for an Accelerated Culture is the debut album from new rave/grindie band Hadouken!. The album contains nine songs, three of which ("Spend Your Life", "What She Did" and "Declaration of War") had been previously played on tour. The album includes two older Hadouken! songs, Liquid Lives and That Boy That Girl.

History 
Live versions of "What She Did" and "Declaration of War" were made available for a limited time on the Atlantic Records YouTube channel.

The first track, "Get Smashed Gate Crash" was added to the bands' MySpace in February 2008.

A clip of "Declaration of War" became available on the internet on 25 March 2008. It was later announced that the song would be a single, and that the video would begin screening at several locations around the country in an unconventional method:
 28 March 2008 - The Fields Church, Trafalgar Square, London
 29 March 2008 - Leeds Cockpit
 30 March 2008 - Manchester MEN Arena
 31 March 2008 - Glasgow ABC2

A further fake copy surfaced two weeks before the release of the album which used 30 second previews of the songs on a loop. The band responded to this stating: "Some moronic blog writers have downloaded this version, failed to spot it's not actually the album and written reviews of it saying that all the songs are really repetitive. Errr megalolzeleven at them. Please buy your own copy and make up your own mind as to whether it's any cop or look out for genuine reviews in all the usual magazines in the next few weeks.".

On 16 May 2008, it was announced that "Crank It Up" would be the fifth single from the album.

The album was released in America on 28 October 2008.

Track listing

Japan Bonus Tracks

References 

2008 debut albums
Hadouken! albums
Atlantic Records albums
Albums produced by Jacknife Lee